West Tennessee School For the Deaf (WTSD) is a public state-operated elementary school serving deaf students ages two through thirteen. It is an agency of the Division of Special Schools of the Tennessee State Department of Education. It is located in Jackson, Tennessee.

As of 2005 the school has about 60 students, who originate from West Tennessee.

History
Prior to the school's establishment, the Tennessee School for the Deaf was the only school for deaf children in Tennessee. In 1972 James McKinney, the speaker of the Tennessee House of Representatives, filed a bill that asked for the Tennessee state government to purchase the campus of Union University in Jackson, Tennessee so a school for deaf children could be established in western Tennessee. The city of Memphis was also seeking to be the location of the school for the deaf.

The school opened in its current location in the northern hemisphere fall of 1986.

As of 2005 the  campus had eight classrooms and two dormitories. The expansion included a conference and meeting area, gymnasium, library, and mezzanine area. The expansion was to use a color scheme highlighting the school color, royal blue, and inexpensive materials. The materials included sealed concrete floors, cementitious board walls, and a galvanized metal roof. The architect was Archimania from Memphis. The expansion was approved by the Tennessee Department of Education, the Tennessee Department of Finance and Administration, and the Tennessee Legislature.

See also
 Tennessee School for the Blind

References

External links

 West Tennessee School For the Deaf

Schools for the deaf in the United States
Jackson, Tennessee
Public elementary schools in Tennessee
1986 establishments in Tennessee
Educational institutions established in 1986
Boarding schools in Tennessee
Public boarding schools in the United States